Patrick Mubarak is a Lebanese actor.

Filmography

Film

Television 
Al Haram. 2016
Nos Yawm. 2016
Cello. 2015
Al Ghaliboun. 2011
Me, You and the Internet. 2007
Strange. 2005
A Man from the Past. 2004
Arabic Language Club. 1998
Youngs and Girls. 1996

References 
General

Specific

External links

Living people
Lebanese male actors
Lebanese male film actors
Lebanese male television actors
Lebanese male voice actors
Year of birth missing (living people)